The Giblet Boys is a British comedy about three brothers, Pud, Kevin and Scurvy, and their adventures usually involving their devious Mum. The show was broadcast between 7 January 2005 and 1 December 2005.

Even though it only ran for two series, the show was still repeated frequently on the CITV channel between 2006 and March 2015.

Cast
 Scurvy – Jack Bannon
 Kevin – Michael Kosminsky
 Pud – Scott Chisholm
 Mum – Anna Mountford
 Dad – Rupert Holliday-Evans
 Miss. Cabin – Charlie Mudie
 Jeweller – Barnaby Edwards
 Mr Saunders – Ross O'Hennessy

External links

ITV children's television shows
2005 British television series debuts
2005 British television series endings
2000s British children's television series
English-language television shows